This is a list of mosques in Morocco. According to the Ministry of Awqaf and Islamic Affairs in 2016, there are around 41,755 mosques in Morocco, of which 16,489 are Jama Masjids, and 10,061 are specifically designated as culturally significant.

See also
Islam in Morocco

References 

Morocco
 
Mosques